The Armed Forces for the National Liberation of East Timor (FALINTIL) originally began as the military wing of the political party FRETILIN of East Timor. It was established on 20 August 1975 in response to FRETILIN's political conflict with the Timorese Democratic Union (UDT).

Indonesian invasion

FALINTIL gained most of its initial military units when most of the former Portuguese garrison forces in the territory switched allegiance to FALINTIL in August 1975, after the Portuguese withdrawal.

At the time of the Indonesian invasion of East Timor in 1975 FALINTIL consisted of 2,500 regular troops, 7,000 who had some Portuguese military training, and 10,000 who had attended short military instruction courses, for a total of 20,000.

The first commander of FALINTIL was Nicolau Lobato. Lobato was killed during a battle with the Indonesian armed forces in 1978  and Xanana Gusmão was elected as his replacement during a secret national conference in Lacluta, Viqueque in 1981. This meeting also saw the formation of the Revolutionary Council of National Resistance (in Portuguese Conselho Revolucinario de Resistencia Nacional or CNNR) (CRRN), which was the first step in uniting the different resistance movement factions under one umbrella organisation.

Resistance struggle

Throughout the 1980s Gusmão, leading both FALINTIL and the CNNR (CRRN) resistance unification movement, began distancing himself from the FRETILIN party and began attempts to make FALINTIL non-partisan, and to make it the armed resistance wing of the unified resistance movement.  On 12 May 1983 Gusmão proclaimed the convergence of all nationalists in their struggle against the Indonesian occupation and by April 1984 Gusmão had proclaimed the ideological independence of FRETILIN from the overall resistance movement, and began to re-structure the armed resistance movement. In the first week of August 1983, FALINTIL fighters attacked an Indonesian Army engineering unit, killing 16 soldiers. On 31 August 1983, the Indonesian Army commenced military operations around Viqueque, about 100 miles from Dili. A spokesman for the Indonesian Embassy in Canberra, said about 3,200 troops in four battalions, including special forces, were deployed with tanks and troop transport aircraft. On 5 May 1985 Gusmão sent the FRETILIN Central Committee, operating in exile, a message informing them of the structure of the CNNR and assuming the title of Commander in Chief of FALINTIL. Significant progress in the unification of the resistance movement occurred in March 1986 when FRETILIN and UDT agreed to the creation of the "nationalist convergence". In the meantime, the FALINTIL guerrilla force continued to attack Indonesian troops. Diplomats in Jakarta later admitted losing between 20 and 35 Indonesian soldiers  killed in a FALINTIL ambush in June 1986.

On 20 June 1988 the National Resistance of East Timorese Students (RENETIL) was created in Indonesia, reporting directly to FALINTIL and its Commander in Chief Xanana Gusmão. On 31 December 1988 Gusmão officially announced that FALINTIL was now the non-partisan armed resistance wing of the unified resistance movement, which was now to be known as the Conselho Nacional da Resistência Maubere (CNRM), the National Council of Maubere Resistance.

Between 23 and 28 May 1990, CNRM held an extraordinary meeting for the purposes of restructuring the entire resistance movement. It was during this conference that Gusmão officially resigned from the FRETILIN party, whilst remaining Commander-in-Chief of FALINTIL and the president of CNRM. This meeting also saw the formation of the Clandestine Front, which came about from the recognition that FALINTIL, the armed resistance, had been significantly weakened by many years of guerrilla activity against the Indonesian military. The formation of the Clandestine Front was a strategy to organize the population against the occupying Indonesian forces. These events saw an upsurge in activity against the unified resistance movement by the occupying forces, which saw many resistance leaders flee to the mountains or overseas, and led to the arrest of Gusmão on 20 November 1992. Ma'Huno, a member of FRETILIN's steering committee, became the leader of the resistance only to be arrested himself on 5 April 1993. Nino Konis Santana replaced the arrested Ma'Huno as leader on 25 April 1993 and by September all factions of the resistance accepted Santana as leader of the overall movement. Taur Matan Ruak was appointed commander of FALINTIL. Under Santana's leadership the restructuring started by Gusmão was further reinforced under the CNRM umbrella with Santana as leader of the Executive Council of "the Struggle", Ruak in charge of FALINTIL, and a man called Sabalae (i.e. Pedro Nunes – Keri Laran Sabalae) taking charge of the Clandestine Front.

Throughout the 1990s the occupying Indonesian forces stepped up their actions against the resistance and factional troubles between FRETILIN and other resistance organizations plagued the CNRM, with FRETILIN members signing a document against the leadership of Santana. Sabalae, the leader of the Clandestine Front, disappeared in June 1995 (captured near Gleno by ABRI on 1 June 1995). Gusmão remained supreme leader of CNRM and Commander in Chief of FALINTIL despite being incarcerated in an Indonesian prison. On 31 May 1997, the East Timorese guerrillas killed 16 policemen and 1 soldier in an ambush near the Abafala Village. (near Quelicai, southeast of Baucau). In 1998 Santana died in an accident and the FALINTIL commander, Ruak, was elected as leader of "the Struggle", whilst also remaining operational commander of FALINTIL. In April 1998 during the National Convention of East Timorese Living Abroad, held in Portugal, the Conselho Nacional da Resistência Timorense (CNRT), the National Council of Timorese Resistance, was formed, replacing CNRM and reinforcing the previous attempts to unify all the factions of the resistance struggle against Indonesia.

Towards independence

Changes in the Indonesian government, together with growing international pressure, saw Indonesian President B. J. Habibie announce a referendum for the East Timorese people to vote on autonomy. The Indonesians also announced that if autonomy was rejected, that would open the door for independence. The Indonesian military provided arms to pro-Indonesian militias to "encourage" the population to vote in favour of autonomy. On 10 August 1999, Gusmão ordered FALINTIL to remain in the cantonments, resist all provocations of the Indonesian military and the armed militias, and not get involved in the civil unrest being orchestrated by the Indonesian military. These orders were generally complied with by FALINTIL, with their fighters remaining in their secret camps during the referendum process. On 30 August, voting in the referendum took place with 98% of registered voters turning out. By 4 September, the UN announced that 78.5% had voted against autonomy, therefore beginning the process of independence. The following day, 5 September, the Indonesian military and the pro-autonomy militias, in response to the referendum, began a massive campaign of looting and violence against the East Timorese people. Gusmão and the CNRT leadership maintained that FALINTIL must resist the urge to join the fight and remain in their cantonments. On 20 September, INTERFET, the Australian Army-led UN-sanctioned military force, landed in East Timor to counter the activities of the armed militias and attempt to restore peace. One of INTERFET's mandates was to disarm all the various factions in East Timor including FALINTIL. Under advice from the now recently released Xanana Gusmão, INTERFET and the UN allowed FALINTIL to remain armed but still staying in their cantonments until peace was restored at which time they would hand over their arms.

The last Commander-in-Chief of FALINTIL was Taur Matan Ruak.

East Timorese armed forces
On 1 February 2001 FALINTIL was officially dissolved, only to be almost immediately resurrected as the official armed force of the newly independent East Timor to be known as FALINTIL – Força de Defesa de Timor Leste (F-FDTL), with the duty under the East Timor constitution to "guarantee the independence of the nation, its territorial integrity, and the freedom and safety of the population against aggression, which does not respect the constitutional order". Taur Matan Ruak became the first Commander of F-FDTL and assumed the rank of Brigadier General.

FANTIL veterans make up a significant portion of the membership of the "politico-criminal" armed groups operating in East Timor, such as Sagrada Familia, CPD-RDTL, and Colimau 2000.

Notes

References
 East Timorese Resistance Museum, Resistencia Timorensia Arkivu ho Muzeu

Separatism in Indonesia
Indonesian occupation of East Timor
Military of East Timor
National liberation armies
Rebel groups in Indonesia